William Kahn (1882–1959) was a German screenwriter, film producer and director of the silent era.

Selected filmography
 The Grehn Case (1916)
 The Sin of Helga Arndt (1916)
 Circus People (1922)
 The Girl Without a Conscience (1922)
 The Salvation Army Girl (1927)
 Girls, Beware! (1928)

References

Bibliography
 Thomas Elsaesser & Michael Wedel. A Second Life: German Cinema's First Decades. Amsterdam University Press, 1996.

External links

1882 births
1959 deaths
Film people from Berlin